Military animals are trained animals that are used in warfare and other combat related activities. As working animals, different military animals serve different functions. Horses, elephants, camels, and other animals have been used for both transportation and mounted attack. Pigeons were used for communication and photographic espionage. Many other animals have been reportedly used in various specialized military functions, including rats and pigs. Dogs have long been employed in a wide variety of military purposes, more recently focusing on guarding and bomb detection, and along with dolphins and sea lions are in active use today.

Use

For transportation and hauling 

 The horse was the most widely used animal throughout the recorded history of warfare. Early mounts could pull a chariot or carry lightly armored skirmishing forces. With the appearance of heavier mounts and the invention of the stirrup, the horse-mounted cavalry became the most prestigious combat arm in Europe for several centuries. A knight's warhorse was trained to bite and kick. The combination of the horse-mounted warrior armed with a bow made the steppe people's armies the most powerful military force in Asian history. With the appearance of modern ranged weapons and motor vehicles, horse use for military purposes fell into decline. However, horses and mules are still used extensively by various armies today for transport in difficult terrain.
 While elephants are not considered domesticable, they can be trained to serve as mounts, or for moving heavy loads. Sanskrit hymns record their use for military purposes as early as 1,100 B.C. A group of elephants was employed by Hannibal during the Second Punic War. They were employed as recently as World War II by both the Japanese and Allies. Elephants could perform the work of machines in locations where vehicles could not penetrate, so they found use in the Burma Campaign.
 Camels have typically seen use as mounts in arid regions (Camel cavalry). They are better able to traverse sandy deserts than horses, and require far less water. Camels were employed in both world wars. Camels are used by the Indian Army and Border Security Force for patrolling in the desert regions of Rajasthan.

In World War II, many military units of the Soviet Red Army, sometime after the Battle of Stalingrad, took to using camels in the southern theatre of the war in order to transport ammunition, fuel for tanks and aircraft, food, water for kitchens, fuel, and even wounded Red Army soldiers. The use of these animals as means of transport was made necessary by the Kalmyk steppes' open terrain, its primitive roads and lack of water, as well as a shortage of adequate auxiliary vehicles in the Soviet armed forces. A case that became famous was that of the Bactrian camel named Kuznechik ("grasshopper") that followed the Soviet Red Army in practically all its advance towards Germany.
 Mules were used by the U.S. Army, the British Army, and the British Indian Army during World War II to carry supplies and equipment over difficult terrain. Pack animals that are innately patient, cautious, and hardy, mules could carry heavy loads of supplies where Jeeps and even pack horses could not travel. Mules were used in North Africa, Burma, and in Italy. They are also used for transporting supplies in mountainous regions.

 Oxen have been used widely in war as beasts of burden, especially to transport heavy or siege artillery through heavy terrain.
Both Sweden and, later, the Soviet Union, attempted to utilize moose as deep-snow cavalry.  Moose were discovered to be unsuitable for warfare, as they easily contracted livestock diseases, were difficult to feed, and fled the battleground.  The Soviets later trained moose not to be gun-shy, but were unable to make use of their cavalry because of the Soviet-Finnish War and World War II.

As weapons

As fighters or mounts

 Dogs were used by the ancient Greeks for war purposes, and they were undoubtedly used much earlier in history. The Roman Empire, starting with Marcus Aurelius, also used dogs in combat. The Romans trained the Molossian dog (or Canis Molossus) specifically for battle, often coating them in protective spiked metal collars and mail armour, and arranging them into attack formations. During their conquest of Latin America, Spanish conquistadors used Alaunts to kill warriors in the Caribbean, Mexico and Peru. Mastiffs, as well as Great Danes, was used in England during the Middle Ages, where their large size was used to scare horses to throw off their riders or to pounce on knights on horseback, disabling them until their master delivered the final blow.
 Ramses II had a pet lion which fought with him during the Battle of Kadesh.
 Pliny the Elder wrote about the use of war pigs against elephants. As he relates it, elephants became scared by the squeal of a pig and would panic, bringing disaster to any soldiers who stood in their path of flight.

 It is unsubstantiated that rhinoceros were used for war functions. By analyzing Albrecht Dürer's famous 1515 woodcut, it is possible that the liberties taken with the rhino's design were in fact designs for a suit of armour created for the rhinoceros's fight in Portugal. However, rhinos' apparently 'thick' or 'plated' skin is actually susceptible and the animals have poor eyesight, heavily limiting their ability to run in a specific direction. Their overly aggressive nature would make them unsuitable for use in mounted combat.
 War elephants were widely used in most parts of South Asia and North Africa, and were also employed by the Diadochi kingdoms, the Kingdom of Kush and the Roman Empire.
 Cattle, in some instances, saw use in battle through manmade stampedes of panicking herds that were driven towards the enemy. This was often a dangerous tactic to those that released them, especially following the invention of gunpowder. In both the Battle of Tondibi and Henry Morgan's siege of Panama, herds of cattle were released onto the battlefield, but stampeded back into their own army's lines due to gunfire from the opposing army.

As living bombs
 Historical accounts of incendiary pigs were recorded by the military writer Polyaenus and by Aelian. Both writers reported that Antigonus II Gonatas' siege of Megara in 266 BC was broken when the Megarians doused some pigs with combustible pitch, crude oil or resin, set them alight, and drove them towards the enemy's massed war elephants. The elephants bolted in terror from the flaming, squealing pigs, often killing great numbers of their own soldiers by trampling them to death.
 According to Pr. Shi Bo, monkeys were used in the beginning of the Southern Song Dynasty, in a battle between rebels of the Yanzhou (Yasuo) province and the Chinese Imperial Army, led by Zhao Yu. The monkeys were used as live incendiary devices. The animals were clothed with straw, dipped in oil and set on fire. They were set loose into the enemy's camp, thereby setting the tents on fire, and driving the whole camp into chaos.
 In 1267, the sheriff of Essex was accused of plotting to release flying cockerels carrying bombs over London.
 Anti-tank dogs – a Soviet, World War II weapon that had mixed success. Canines with explosives strapped to their backs were used as anti-tank weapons.
 Project Pigeon – a proposed U.S. World War II weapon that used pigeons to guide bombs.
 Bat bomb, a U.S. project that used Mexican free-tailed bats to carry small incendiary bombs.
 Animal-borne bombs have been used by modern terrorists and insurgents in the Middle East, who have affixed explosives to animals, sometimes left wandering alone, and other times ridden by suicide bombers, in modern insurgent attacks in the Middle East.

To conceal explosive devices

 Exploding rat – dead rats were prepared for use by the British Special Operations Executive in World War II against Germany. Rat carcasses were filled with plastic explosives, to be left in locations such as factories where, it was hoped, the stoker tending a boiler would likely dispose of the unpleasant discovery by shoveling it into the furnace, causing it to explode. The rats contained only a small amount of explosive; however, a puncture of a high-pressure boiler could trigger a devastating boiler explosion.
 Animals' carcasses have been used to camouflage roadside improvised explosive devices during the Iraqi insurgency.

In communications

Homing pigeons have seen use since medieval times for carrying messages. They were still employed for a similar purpose during World War I and World War II. In World War II, experiments were also performed in the use of the pigeon for guiding missiles, known as Project Pigeon. The pigeon was placed inside so that they could see out through a window. They were trained to peck at controls to the left or right, depending on the location of a target shape.

Some dogs also saw use as messengers.

For morale
There is a long-standing tradition of military mascots – animals associated with military units that act as emblems, pets or take part in ceremonies.

For espionage
In the years before the First World War pigeon photography was introduced to military intelligence gathering. Although employed during major battles like at Verdun and Somme, the method was not particularly successful. Various attempts in this direction were made during the Second World War as well. A CIA pigeon camera dating from the 1970s is displayed in the CIA Museum; details of CIA missions using this camera are still classified.

The Acoustic Kitty was a CIA project to use surgically modified cats to spy on the Kremlin and Soviet embassies in the 1960s. Despite expenditure of around $10 million, the project failed to produce practical results and was cancelled in 1967. Documents about the project were declassified in 2001.

In 2006, The Independent ran a story that the "Pentagon develops brain implants to turn sharks into military spies".

In 2007 Iranian authorities captured 14 squirrels, which were allegedly carrying spying equipment. The story was widely dismissed in the West as "nuts".

A number of spying scares in the Middle East involved birds. According to Israeli ornithologist Yossi Leshem, Sudanese authorities detained an Egyptian vulture in the late 1970s, and a white pelican in the early 1980s, both carrying Israeli equipment used for animal migration tracking. A more mediatized event was the 2011 capture by a Saudi farmer of a griffon vulture, which was eventually released by the Saudi authorities after they determined that the Israeli equipment it carried was used for scientific purposes. This was followed by international mockery and criticism of the Arab media outlets which uncritically had reported on the bird's alleged role in espionage. In 2012, a dead European bee-eater tagged with an Israeli leg band was found by villagers near the south-eastern Turkish city of Gaziantep. The villagers worried that the bird may have carried a micro-chip from Israeli intelligence to spy on the area. Turkish authorities examined the corpse of the bee-eater and assured villagers that it is common to equip migratory birds with rings in order to track their movements.

For locating hazards 
Dogs have been used for detecting mines; they were trained to spot trip wires, as well as mines and other booby traps. They were also employed for sentry duty, and to spot snipers or hidden enemy forces.

On land, giant pouched rats such as the Gambian giant pouched rat have been tested with considerable success as specialised mine detecting animals, as their keen sense of smell helps in the identification of explosives and their small size prevents them from triggering land mines.

Chickens were used during the Gulf Wars to detect poisonous gases in an operation called Kuwaiti Field Chicken (KFC); the designation of the US Marines for chickens used in this role was Poultry Chemical Confirmation Devices. The plan was put on hold after 41 of 43 chicken used for such purposes died within a week of arrival in Kuwait.

Beginning during the Cold War, research has been done into the uses of many species of marine mammals for military purposes. The U.S. Navy Marine Mammal Program uses military dolphins and sea lions for underwater sentry duty, mine clearance, and object recovery.

Other specialized functions

Cats were used in the Royal Navy to control vermin on board ships. Able seacat Simon of HMS Amethyst received the Dickin Medal.

During the Spanish Civil War (1936–1939), Nationalist pilots attached fragile supplies to live turkeys, which descended flapping their wings, thus serving as parachutes which could also be eaten by the defenders of the monastery of Santa Maria de la Cabeza.

Furthermore, use of military chickens was proposed in the British Blue Peacock project. The scheme involved burying nuclear bombs in the ground for later detonation should occupied (West) Germany be overrun by Warsaw Pact forces. The primitive electronic devices of the 1950s were unreliable in frozen ground, and the chickens were considered as a source of biogenic heat. This story has often been reported as an April Fool's joke, but when it was declassified and proven to be a true story on 1 April 2004 (April Fool's Day), the head of education and interpretation at the UK National Archives said, "It does seem like an April Fool but it most certainly is not. The Civil Service does not do jokes."

Notable examples

 In the Battle of Pelusium (525 BC) between the Achaemenid Empire and Ancient Egypt, the Achaemenid forces used cats and other animals as psychological tactic against the Egyptians, who avoided harming cats due to religious beliefs.
 During the Warring States period of Chinese history, Qi general Tian Dan is said to have had 1,000 oxen dressed and painted like dragons, then their tails lit on fire and sent against the opposing Yan army.
 In the Battle of Ager Falernus, Hannibal Barca had torches attached to the horns of bulls before being set alight during nightfall and allowing them to run amok. The Romans, believing the torchlight was from fleeing Carthaginian soldiers, pursued the cattle and were caught in an ambush.
 Many famous generals had renowned mounts, including Julius Caesar's legendary horse with "toes" described by Suetonius, the Duke of Wellington's famed charger Copenhagen,  Napoleon Bonaparte's Marengo, Alexander the Great's horse Bucephalus, and Robert E. Lee's horse Traveller.
 Corporal Jackie, a baboon who fought in world war I.
 The movie Wanted features rats strapped with explosive devices, used in a similar manner to the bats of Project X-ray during World War II.
 The 2010 British film Four Lions has one of the main characters attaching home made bombs to crows, in an attempt to commit Jihad.
The Westwood Studios game Command & Conquer: Red Alert 2 features the Allies using dolphins, the Soviets using giant squid, and both sides using dogs.
Wojtek, a Syrian brown bear cub, served with the Polish II Corps, and famously fought at the Battle of Monte Cassino.

Alleged military use of animals
During the British occupation of Basra, rumours of "man-eating badgers" emerged from the local population, including allegations that these beasts were released by the British troops, something that the British strenuously denied. The event received coverage in the Western press during the 2007 silly season.

See also
 Animal–industrial complex
 Animal training
 Biological warfare
 Entomological warfare
 Cruelty to animals
 Remote control animal
 
 Ship's cat

References

Further reading
 Blanchard, Lucy M, Chico, The story of a Homing Pigeon in the Great War (Diggory Press), 
 
 Dyer, Walter A., Ben, the Battle Horse, 
 Itoh, Mayumi (2010). Japanese Wartime Zoo Policy: The Silent Victims of World War II. Palgrave-MacMillan. .
 Nocella, Anthony J. II, ed. et al., "Animals and War: Confronting the Military-Animal Industrial Complex" (2013, Lexington Books), .
 Peters, Anne; de Hemptinne, Jérôme; Kolb, Robert, eds. (2022). Animals in the International Law of Armed Conflict. Cambridge University Press.

External links

 Cats in the Sea Services
 War Dogs
 Other Animals Who Served
 An Additional “R”: Remembering the Animals (PDF), an article about memorials for animals, including military animals. HTML version, without photos.

 
Animals by use